Milenko Vlajkov (born August 9, 1950) is a  psychologist and psychotherapist, author and meditation master in the school of Individual Meditation. His spiritual name as leader (lineage holder) of Individual Meditation is Juen Xian.

Early life and education
Vlajkov was born in Novi Sad, Serbia. He studied psychology at the University of Belgrade where he completed his studies with a bachelor's degree in 1975. In 1987 he obtained a master's degree at the faculty of philosophy with his thesis “Perception of Interpersonal Relationships and Motivation for Work”.
He was trained as REBT therapist from 1991-1995 at the Albert Ellis Institute in New York and became International Supervisor for REBT in 1996. In 1998 he was elected as Member of the International Training Standards and Policy Review Committee of the Albert Ellis Institute in New York.
In 1992 he fled the Yugoslav Civil Wars to Germany where he was granted political asylum.

Career
From 1979-1989, Milenko Vlajkov worked as clinical psychologist at the outpatient’s clinic of Novi Sad. He was a leading methodologist at the Centre for Comparative Studies of Technological & Social Progress in Novi Sad from 1981-1987 and worked as professor of psychology at the high school of Management and Informatics at the University of Novi Sad from 1989 to 1992.

In 1999 he became the founder and president of the Association for Cognitive Management and of the Institute for Cognitive Management in Stuttgart, Germany, an affiliated training centre of the Albert Ellis Institute in New York.

ATOS
In 1993 he established ATOS, a mental technique that is based on the principle of homoeostasis in the human body. The method means to balance the processes that are controlled by the autonomic nervous system. It contains exercises which address all six senses (balancing, seeing, hearing, smelling, tasting and feeling) and a mental exercise that is superior to the previous six. Milenko Vlajkov regularly gives lectures on ATOS and trains people to become ATOS teachers.

Meditation
From 26 July 1970 to November 1984 Milenko Vlajkov was trained and taught in Individual Meditation by his teacher and meditation master Dhaly Charma, a doctor and known Rinpoche who was the lineage holder of the Individual Meditation at the time. During that time Vlajkov practiced various meditations and meditation techniques till he mastered them. He was further trained in TCM (Traditional Chinese Medicine) and learned how to use acupuncture, pulse and tongue diagnosis.

In 1984 he received all responsibility for the 1200-year-old tradition of the Individual Meditation from his master Dhaly Charma.

Milenko Vlajkov gives worldwide seminars and lectures on meditation, he regularly organises weekly and daily retreats and global study trips that seek to explore different cultures in a way to promote the meditative development of his disciples.

Vlajkov stresses the active approach of Individual Meditation and tells his students how to “make the best version of themselves” and to establish this aim in every field of life.

Personal life
Milenko Vlajkov has two grown daughters and lives with his wife Simona in Stuttgart, Germany.

Publications
Milenko Vlajkov (1990). Na sopstvenom tragu – Relaksacija i meditacija. .
Milenko Vlajkov (2000): Die Atosmethode. Psychologie des Ausgleichs. Kognitives Management Verlag Stuttgart.
Juen Xian (2005). Zähmen des Elefanten und des Affen. Kognitives Management Verlag Stuttgart. 
Juen Xian (2009). Wie zähmt man einen Elefanten und einen Affen? Individuelle Meditation in 12 Bildern und 16 Erzählungen. Verlag Kristkeitz. .
Juen Xian (2011). Der Glänzende Geist Teil 1 - Die Entstehung der Lehre der Individuellen Meditation: Die ersten Jahre ab 810 u. Z.. Verlag Kristkeitz. .
Juen Xian (2011). How do you tame an elephant and a monkey?. Kindle Edition. ASIN B0058PE65M.
Milenko Vlajkov (2011). Racionalno-Emotivno-Bihejvioralna-Terapija. .
Juen Xian (2012). Der Glänzende Geist Teil 2 - Der Wandel vom Schüler zum Meister. Verlag Kristkeitz. .
Juen Xian (2013). Wie zähmt man einen Elefanten und einen Affen? Individuelle Meditation in 12 Bildern und 16 Erzählungen. Kindle Edition.
Juen Xian (2013). Der Glänzende Geist (Bd. 1) - Die Entstehung der Lehre der Individuellen Meditation: Die ersten Jahre ab 810 u. Z. Kindle Edition.
Juen Xian (2013). Der Glänzende Geist (Bd. 2) - Die Entstehung der Lehre der Individuellen Meditation: Der Wandel vom Schüler zum Meister. Kindle Edition.

References

External links
https://www.youtube.com/watch?v=Pr7XKuDIjs8

1950 births
Living people